Kolachery is a census town
and Grama Panchayat in Kannur District of Kerala state, India.

Local administration
Kolachery Grama Panchayat was formed by merging two villages (viz) Kolachery census town & Cheleri village. It belongs to Edakkad Block and politically part of Taliparamba Assembly constituency under Kannur Loksabha constituency. The panchayat got the award for the best panchayath in the district in  2015.

Demographics
As of 2011 Census, Kolacherry had a population of 17,095 with 7,847 males and 9,248 females. The sex ratio was 1,178 higher than state average of 1,084. In Kolachery, population of children under 6 years was 13.2%. Kolachery had overall literacy of 93% higher than national average of 59% and lower than state average of 94%.

Religion
As of 2011 Indian census, Kolachery census town had population of 17,095 which constitute 47% Hindus, 52.6% Muslims and 0.4% others.

Suburbs
Karinkalkuzhi, Kolacherimukku, Kambil, Pampuruthi, Patyam, Chelerimukku, Pallipparamba,

Transportation
The national highway passes through Valapattanam town.  Goa and Mumbai can be accessed on the northern side and Cochin and Thiruvananthapuram can be accessed on the southern side.  The road to the east of Iritty connects to Mysore and Bangalore.   The nearest railway station is Kannur on Mangalore-Palakkad line. 
Trains are available to almost all parts of India subject to advance booking over the internet.  There are airports at Mattanur, Mangalore and Calicut. All of them are international airports but direct flights are available only to Middle Eastern countries.

References

Villages near Mayyil
Cities and towns in Kannur district